= Tasamuh =

Arabic word meaning tolerance

Tasāmuḥ (Arabic: تسامح) is an Arabic word meaning tolerance that is used by the Muslim world in various languages as a loanword. It is also frequently used with hilm (kind forbearance), afuw (pardoning), and safh (overlooking and disregarding).

== Meaning ==
Derived from the Arabic term, Tasamuh means 'tolerance' or 'open-minded'. In other words, it is being accepting and peaceful towards any situation faced. For example, tolerance in religion is an attitude of mutual respect for the rights and obligations between religions. The Muslim should generally forgive when he is able to take revenge, tolerate others' mistakes, be easy going, respect other faiths, and be merciful as Islam is a religion of mercy (deen al-rahmah).

== Examples of application ==
Many scholars have written examples of how to apply tasamuh in one's life. Some examples are as follows:

1. Be open-minded in accepting all differences because differences are the grace of God.
2. Do not differentiate (discriminate) against friends who have different beliefs.
3. Do not force others in terms of belief (religion).
4. Do not disturb others who have different beliefs when they worship.
5. Continue to socialize and be kind to people who have different beliefs in worldly matters.
6. Respect others who are worshiping.
7. Do not hate and hurt the feelings of someone who has different beliefs or opinions from us.
8. Looking after each other and respecting each other's differences and providing peace.

Tasāmuḥ does not mean changing your religion or breaking its injunctions, but rather it means respecting other religions and their freedom to practice their beliefs.
